Nakul class of tugboats are series of service watercraft built by Tebma Shipyard Limited. (a subsidiary of Bharati Shipyard Ltd), for Indian navy during 2004. The vessels in the class have a rated capacity of 25 ton bollard pull. Propulsion is provided by Voith Schneider Propellers. It is a follow-up of Madan Singh class tugboat.

Ships in the class

Specifications
The specifications are from the website of the manufacturer Tebma Shipyard Ltd.

Length: 32.5 m
Breadth: 9.50 m
Depth: 4 m
Speed: 12 knots
Bollard pull: 25 tonnes
Displacement: 373.14 tonnes
Draft: 2.8 m
Output :2 x 1320 kW
Main engines: Wartsila 8 L20

See also
Tugboats of the Indian Navy

References

 
Auxiliary ships of the Indian Navy
Tugs of the Indian Navy
Auxiliary tugboat classes